MacDonagh Park is a GAA stadium in Nenagh, County Tipperary, Ireland.  It is the home ground of the Nenagh Éire Óg club and has often been used for inter-county matches, including some of Tipperary's National Hurling League fixtures.

See also
 List of Gaelic Athletic Association stadiums

References

Nenagh
Sports venues in County Tipperary
Tipperary GAA venues